Jarod Lucas (born December 7, 1999) is an American college basketball player for the Nevada Wolf Pack  of the Mountain West Conference.

High school career
Lucas played basketball for Los Altos High School in Hacienda Heights, California, where he was coached by his father. As a senior, he averaged 39.4 points, 11.3 rebounds and 4.4 assists per game. He scored 3,356 points during his high school career, the most in CIF Southern Section history. Lucas competed for the Compton Magic on the Amateur Athletic Union circuit. He committed to playing college basketball for Oregon State over offers from Ole Miss, Nevada, Tulsa and Santa Clara.

College career
As a freshman at Oregon State, Lucas averaged 4.6 points per game. On February 27, 2021, he scored a career-high 26 points in a 73–62 win over Stanford. Lucas helped Oregon State win its first Pac-12 tournament and was named to the All-Tournament Team. He averaged 12.7 points, 2.3 rebounds, and 1.2 assists per game and led Oregon State to the Elite Eight of the NCAA Tournament.

Following the 2021–22 season, Lucas entered the NCAA transfer portal.

Career statistics

College

|-
| style="text-align:left;"| 2019–20
| style="text-align:left;"| Oregon State
| 31 || 0 || 13.1 || .351 || .342 || .870 || .9 || .4 || .3 || .0 || 4.6
|-
| style="text-align:left;"| 2020–21
| style="text-align:left;"| Oregon State
| style="background:#cfecec;"|33* || 23 || 29.3 || .380 || .389 || .896 || 2.3 || 1.2 || .7 || .0 || 12.7
|- class="sortbottom"
| style="text-align:center;" colspan="2"| Career
| 64 || 23 || 21.5 || .373 || .375 || .888 || 1.6 || .8 || .5 || .0 || 8.8

Personal life
Lucas' father, Jeff, played college basketball at Hawaii and serves as head coach for Los Altos High School. His mother Christina played volleyball in high school. His younger brother, Jordan, is a standout volleyball player at Los Altos and has represented the United States at the youth level. Lucas is of Filipino descent.

References

External links
Oregon State Beavers bio

1999 births
Living people
American men's basketball players
Basketball players from California
Sportspeople from Whittier, California
Point guards
Shooting guards
Oregon State Beavers men's basketball players
American sportspeople of Filipino descent